Kenneth La'ron (born August 5, 1997), known by his stage name KennyHoopla, is an American singer, songwriter and musician. He is primarily known from his singles "How Will I Rest in Peace if I'm Buried by a Highway?" and "Estella". He released his commercial debut EP How Will I Rest in Peace if I'm Buried by a Highway? on May 15, 2020.

Early life 
La'ron was born in Cleveland, Ohio. He moved to Oshkosh, Wisconsin as a child. He spent a large part of his youth in-between the two cities. When asked about his earliest musical memory in an interview with DIY magazine, La'ron recalled recording a "horrible" freestyle rap on a cassette toy his mother gave him when he was around 10 years old.

Music career

2016–2019: Beneath the Willow Tree and other singles 
KennyHoopla began posting songs to his SoundCloud page in 2016. On October 5, 2016, he released an EP titled Beneath the Willow Tree to SoundCloud, which consisted of some of the tracks he had posted throughout the year, as well as some new songs. The EP received acclaim from several music blogs, who considered him an artist to watch. On October 26, he uploaded the song "Cave" to SoundCloud, which became his most streamed song on the site at the time.

On August 6, 2017, he released his commercial debut single "Waves", along with a music video. This was followed by "Sickness" in 2018. On February 1, 2019, he released the single "Lost Cause", which became his most popular song at the time and gained him more exposure. Its music video was released on February 6. This was followed by "Sore Loser" on September 18, which was also positively received.

2020–present: How Will I Rest in Peace if I'm Buried by a Highway? and Survivors Guilt: The Mixtape 
On February 4, 2020, KennyHoopla released the single "How Will I Rest in Peace if I'm Buried by a Highway?" This track quickly became his most popular song to date, becoming his first song to reach 1 million views on YouTube, and garnering praise for its unique post-punk and new wave inspired sound. The track also received radio play on alternative music stations, and peaked at number 8 on the Billboard Alternative Airplay chart. On March 12, he released the follow-up single, "The World is Flat and This is the Edge".

On May 13, 2020, he released the single "Plastic Door", and announced that his EP How Will I Rest in Peace if I'm Buried by a Highway? would be released that Friday, May 15. The EP received critical acclaim, being praised for its versatile mixture of sounds such as indie rock, hip hop, pop punk, and drum and bass. On August 28, he released a reworked version of his 2019 single "Lost Cause", featuring guest vocals from Grandson. On October 14, he released another version of the song, this time featuring guest vocals from Jesse Rutherford of The Neighbourhood.

On October 12, 2020, he revealed that he is working on his debut album. Two days later, on October 14, he posted a picture to his Twitter account of him in the studio with Blink-182 drummer Travis Barker. On November 20, he released the song "Estella", which features Barker on drums. Its music video was released five days later, on November 25.

On May 7, 2021, he released the single "Hollywood Sucks" featuring Travis Barker, and announced that he would be releasing the mixtape Survivors Guilt: The Mixtape on June 11.

KennyHoopla is scheduled to support Yungblud in London on his Occupy the UK tour in 2021, and Machine Gun Kelly on his 2021 Tickets to My Downfall U.S. tour, alongside Jxdn and Carolesdaughter.

Musical style
La'ron's music has been categorised as indie rock, and pop punk, often incorporating elements of new wave and dance-punk.

Discography

Mixtapes

Extended plays

Singles

As featured artist

Tours

Headlining 
 Survivors Guilt Tour (2022)
 Home for the Holidays (2022)

Supporting 
 Yungblud - Occupy the UK Tour (2021)
 Machine Gun Kelly - Tickets to My Downfall Tour (2021)

Notes

References

Living people
People from Cleveland
American alternative rock musicians
Singers from Ohio
Alternative rock singers
American pop rock singers
1997 births
African-American rock musicians
21st-century African-American male singers